Bryant is an English surname, a variant of "Bryan". Notable people with the surname include:

A
Aidy Bryant (born 1987), American actress and comedian
Albert Bryant Jr. (born 1952), American general
Alexander Bryant or Briant (1556–1581), English Jesuit martyr
Anita Bryant (born 1940), American singer and former gay rights opponent
Anthony J. Bryant (born 1961), American historian of Japan
Antonio Bryant (born 1981), American football player
Arthur Bryant (1899–1985), British historian
Austin Bryant (born 1996), American football player

B
Bart Bryant (1962–2022), American golfer
Bear Bryant (1913–1983), American college football coach
Benjamin Bryant (born 1977), American broadcaster, filmmaker, and former government official
Bob Bryant (disambiguation), multiple people
Bobby Bryant (disambiguation), multiple people
Boudleaux Bryant (1920–1987), American songwriter
Brad Bryant (born 1954), American professional golfer
Brady Bryant (born 1982), American soccer player
Brandon Bryant (disambiguation), multiple people
Bunyan Bryant (born 1935), environmental justice advocate and academic

C
Castell V. Bryant (born 1948), President of Florida A&M University
C. Farris Bryant (1914–2002), American politician
Charles Bryant (disambiguation), multiple people
Chase Bryant (born 1993), American country singer and songwriter
Chris Bryant (born 1962), British politician
Christian Bryant (born 1992), American football player
Clay Bryant (1911–1999), Major League Baseball player for Chicago Cubs
Clora Bryant (1927–2019), American jazz trumpeter
Cleve Bryant (1947-2023), American college football coach
Coby Bryant (born 1999), American football player
Cora Mae Bryant (1926–2008), American blues musician

D
Dan Bryant (disambiguation), multiple people
David Bryant (disambiguation), multiple people
Desmond Bryant (born 1985), American football player
Dez Bryant (born 1988), American football player
Dezerea Bryant (born 1993), American sprinter
Diana Bryant (born 1947), Australian judge
Domingo Bryant (born 1963), American football player

E
Ed Bryant (born 1948), American politician
Edward Bryant (1945–2017), American writer
Edwin Bryant (disambiguation), multiple people
 Elbridge Bryant (1939–1975), American singer
Elijah Bryant (born 1995), American basketball player in the Israeli Basketball Premier League
Elizabeth Bangs Bryant (1875–1953), British arachnologist
Em Bryant (born 1938), American professional basketball player

F
Felice Bryant (1925–2003), American songwriter
Fernando Bryant (born 1977), American football player
Frank Bryant (cricketer) (1909–1984), Australian cricketer and cricket administrator

G
Gary Bryant Jr. (born 2001), American football player
Gordon Bryant (1914–1991), Australian politician
Gridley Bryant (1789–1867), American railroad engineer
Gridley James Fox Bryant (1816–1899), American architect
Gyude Bryant (1949–2014), Liberian politician

H
Harold Child Bryant (1886–1968), American outdoors nature educator
Harrison Bryant (born 1998), American football player
Henry Bryant (disambiguation), multiple people
Hunter Bryant (born 1998), American football player

J
Jacky Bryant, fictional character from Virtua Fighter
Jacob Bryant, (1715–1804), British scholar and mythographer
Jen Bryant (born 1960), American poet, novelist and children's author
Jennings Bryant (1944–2020), American scientist
Jim Bryant (disambiguation), multiple people
Jimmy Bryant (1925–1980), American guitarist
Joe Bryant (born 1954), American basketball player, father of Kobe Bryant
John Bryant (disambiguation), multiple people
Joseph D. Bryant (1845–1914), New York Surgeon General
Joshua Bryant (born 1940), actor best known for playing Scully in M*A*S*H
Joshua D Bryant (born 1987), American PhD scientist
Joy Bryant (born 1976), American actress
Joyce Bryant (1927–2022), American singer and actress

K
Karyn Bryant (born 1968), American actress
Kaylee Bryant (born 1997), American actress and model
Kelly Bryant (born 1996), American football player
Kelvin Bryant (born 1960), American football player
Kobe Bryant (1978–2020), American basketball player
Kris Bryant (born 1992), American baseball player

L
Lane Bryant, American clothes designer
Lori Bryant-Woolridge (born 1958), American writer
Louise Bryant (1885–1936), American journalist
Lucas Bryant (born 1978), Canadian actor

M
Ma'Khia Bryant (1994/1995 – 2021), American teen fatally shot by police
Maida Bryant (1926 – 2016), New Zealand nurse, local politician, and community leader
Margot Bryant (1897–1988), British actress
Mark Bryant (disambiguation), multiple people
Martin Bryant (born 1967), Australian spree killer and perpetrator of the 1996 Port Arthur massacre
Martin Bryant (programmer) (born 1958), British computer programmer
Mary Bryant (born 1765), convict transported to Australia
Matt Bryant (born 1975), American football player
Matt Bryant (footballer) (born 1970), football player with Bristol City and Gillingham
Michael Bryant (disambiguation), multiple people
Miriam Bryant (born 1991), Swedish-Finnish singer-songwriter
Myles Bryant (born 1998), American football player

N
Nicola Bryant (born 1964), British actress

O
Orshawante Bryant (born 1978), American football player

P
Peter Bryant (disambiguation), several people
Phil Bryant (born 1954), American politician
Precious Bryant (1942–2013), American musician

R
Ralph Bryant (born 1961), Major League Baseball player
Ralph C. Bryant (1877–1939), American professor of forestry
Randal Bryant (born 1952), American computer scientist
Ray Bryant (1931–2011), American jazz pianist, composer
Red Bryant (born 1984), American football defensive end
Rick Bryant (1948–2019), New Zealand singer
Romby Bryant (born 1979), Canadian football wide receiver
Ron Bryant (born 1947), American Major League Baseball pitcher
Ronny Rey Bryant (aka Baby Bash) (born 1975), American rapper

S
Samuel W. Bryant (1877–1938), American admiral
Sarah Bryant (disambiguation), multiple people
Scott Poulson-Bryant, American music journalist
Stanley Bryant (born 1985), American football player

T
Terl Bryant, British drummer, member of the band Iona

V
Vanessa Bryant (born 1982), American philanthropist, nonprofit executive, and former model
Ventell Bryant (born 1996), American football player

W
Wallace Bryant (born 1959), American professional basketball player
Wanda G. Bryant (born 1956), American judge
Waymond Bryant (born 1952), American football linebacker
Wayne R. Bryant (born 1947),  American politician
Wendell Bryant (born 1980), American football player
William Bryant (disambiguation), multiple people
William Cullen Bryant (1794–1878), American poet and journalist
Winston Bryant (born 1938), Arkansas Lieutenant Governor and attorney general

See also
Bryant (disambiguation)
Briant (disambiguation)
Bryan (disambiguation)
Senator Bryant (disambiguation)

English-language surnames